Otto Müller (16 October 1874 – 24 September 1930) was a German painter and printmaker of the Die Brücke expressionist movement.

Life and work
Mueller was born in Liebau (now Lubawka, Kamienna Góra County), Kreis Landeshut, Silesia. Between 1890 and 1892 he was trained in lithography in Görlitz and Breslau. From 1894 to 1896 he studied at the Academy of Fine Arts in Dresden and continued his study in Munich during 1898. He left Munich's academy after Franz von Stuck classified him as untalented.

His early works are influenced by impressionism, Jugendstil and Symbolism. When he settled to Berlin in 1908, his style became more expressionist. During this time there were meetings with Wilhelm Lehmbruck, Rainer Maria Rilke and Erich Heckel. In 1910, he joined 'Die Brücke', a Dresden-based group of Expressionist artists. He was member of the group until it disbanded in 1913 due to artistic differences. At the same time Mueller also had contact with the artists group 'Der Blaue Reiter'.

During World War I he fought as a German soldier in France and Russia. After the war he became a professor at the Academy of Arts (Akademie der Bildenden Kunste) in Breslau where he taught until his death on 24 September 1930. Johnny Friedlaender and Isidor Ascheim were among his pupils there.

In 1937 the Nazis seized 357 of his works from German museums as "degenerate art". They also looted Mueller' artworks from Jewish collectors like the Littmanns. Other Muellers were lost or stolen during the war Several artworks by Mueller turned up in the Gurlitt hoard.

Mueller was one of the most lyrical of German expressionist painters. The main topic of Mueller's works is the unity of humans and nature;  his paintings emphasize a harmonious simplification of form, colour and contours. He is known especially for his characteristic paintings of nudes and Romani women; his nickname was "Gypsy Mueller" and his mother was perhaps Romani. The medium he preferred for his paintings was distemper on coarse canvas, which produced a mat surface. Altogether his printmaking amounted to 172 prints, nearly all of them lithographs, but including a few woodcuts and etchings.

Works

Notes

References
Moeller, Magdalena M. The Brücke Museum, Berlin. Prestel, 2001.
Wolf, Norbert. Expressionism. Taschen, 2006.

External links

Available Works & Biography Galerie Ludorff, Düsseldorf, Germany

1874 births
1930 deaths
People from Lubawka
German Army personnel of World War I
19th-century German painters
19th-century German male artists
German male painters
20th-century German painters
20th-century German male artists
German Expressionist painters
People from the Province of Silesia
Academy of Fine Arts, Munich alumni
20th-century German printmakers
German Romani people
Romani painters